The 1997–98 Liga Indonesia Premier Division (known as the Liga Kansas for sponsorship reasons) was the fourth season of the Liga Indonesia Premier Division, the top division of Indonesian football. There were 31 teams involved in this season. Persebaya were the defending champions, and were leading when the season was abandoned by order of the military on 25 May 1998 due to political and economic turmoil in the country. At that point, 234 matches had been played out of the 317 scheduled.

Teams

Team changes 
The number of teams dropped from 33 to 31 this season.

Relegated to First Division 

 Mataram Indocement
 Persedikab
 Persijatim

Promoted to Premier Division 

 Persikabo
 Persikota
 PSIM

Disbanded 

 ASGS
 Bandung Raya

Name changes 

 Pelita Jaya changed their name to Pelita Jakarta.

Stadiums and locations

First stage

West Division

Central Division

East Division

Top goalscorer
 Kurniawan Dwi Yulianto (Pelita Jakarta) is the top goalscorer of Liga Indonesia 1997-1998 with 20 goals.

References

Indonesian Premier Division seasons
1997–98 in Indonesian football
Indonesia
Top level Indonesian football league seasons